Jesse Urikhob (born 19 March 1991) is a Namibian athlete specialising in the sprinting events. He won a silver medal in the 4 × 100 metres relay at the 2015 African Games.

His personal bests are 10.42 in the 100 metres (+2.0 m/s, Maputo 2011) and 20.85 in the 200 metres (+0.9 m/s, Kingston 2015).

Competition record

References

External links
All-Athletics profile

1991 births
Living people
Namibian male sprinters
Athletes (track and field) at the 2015 African Games
African Games silver medalists for Namibia
African Games medalists in athletics (track and field)
Competitors at the 2011 Summer Universiade
Competitors at the 2013 Summer Universiade
20th-century Namibian people
21st-century Namibian people